"So Insane" is the second promo single from Smash Mouth's 2006 album, Summer Girl. The promo single contains a radio edit of the song (for US radio) and the album version. Without a music video, or promotion, the single never charted on Billboard's Top 100; however, it did reach position No. 25 on the US Adult Top 40 chart. It was made for the film Zoom.

Chart performance

References

2006 singles
Smash Mouth songs
2006 songs
Songs written for films
Songs written by Greg Camp